·

The Sinaia Casino is located in "Dimitrie Ghica" park, Sinaia, Romania and was built at the initiative of King Carol I of Romania.

Construction began in 1912 and was finished a year later. The work was supervised by architect Petre Antonescu, who was also the author of the plans. The main shareholder in the casino was Baron of Marçay, a shareholder in the Monte Carlo Casino. The opening was celebrated with fireworks and a piano recital by George Enescu, in the presence of Alexandru Davila and Titu Maiorescu. The casino became a major attraction between the wars.

After the communist takeover in the late 1940s, gambling ceased and the casino is now an international conference center.

References

Further reading
Cazinoul din Sinaia, de la Ceauşeşti la investitorii strategici din străinătate Archived (in Romanian), 15 February 2010, jurnalul.ro

External links

Casinos completed in 1913
Casinos in Romania
Sinaia
Buildings and structures in Prahova County
1913 establishments in Romania
Art Nouveau architecture in Romania